Oleh Olehovych Ostapenko (born 11 June 1997) is a Ukrainian football defender who plays for Metalurh Zaporizhzhia.

Career
Ostapenko is a product of his native FC Nyva Vinnytsia.

In 2014 he signed contract with FC Vorskla and continued his career as player in the Ukrainian Premier League Reserves. And in March 2017 Ostapenko was promoted to the main-squad team of FC Vorskla in the Ukrainian Premier League. He made his debut as a substituted player for Vorskla Poltava in the Ukrainian Premier League in a match against FC Karpaty Lviv on 15 April 2017.

Personal life
Ostapenko is a son of the retired Ukrainian goalkeeper and current manager Oleh Ostapenko.

References

External links
 
 

1997 births
Living people
Footballers from Vinnytsia
Ukrainian footballers
Association football defenders
FC Vorskla Poltava players
FC Chornomorets Odesa players
FC Nyva Vinnytsia players
FC Metalurh Zaporizhzhia players
Ukrainian Premier League players